Peter Kinik (born 21 May 1986) is a Slovakian Paralympic archer.

In the 2016 Summer Paralympics, Kinik won his first Paralympic medal which was bronze.

References

Paralympic archers of Slovakia
Archers at the 2012 Summer Paralympics
Archers at the 2016 Summer Paralympics
Paralympic bronze medalists for Slovakia
Living people
Slovak male archers
1986 births
Medalists at the 2016 Summer Paralympics
Paralympic medalists in archery
Sportspeople from Spišská Nová Ves